104 Herculis is a solitary variable star located around 560 light years away from the Sun in the northern constellation of Hercules. It has the variable star designation V669 Herculis and the Bayer designation A Herculis, while 104 Herculis is the Flamsteed designation. This object is visible to the naked eye as a dim, red-hued point of light with a baseline apparent visual magnitude of 4.96. It is moving closer to the Earth with a heliocentric radial velocity of −1.2 km/s.

This is an aging red giant star on the asymptotic giant branch with a stellar classification of M3 III. It is a semiregular variable with an amplitude of 0.14 in the B-band and pulsation periods of 22.9 and 24.0 days. Having exhausted the hydrogen at its core, the star has expanded to 86 times the Sun's radius. It is radiating 1,202 times the Sun's luminosity from its swollen photosphere at an effective temperature of 3,535 K.

References

M-type giants
Semiregular variable stars
Hercules (constellation)
Herculis, A
Durchmusterung objects
Herculis, 104
167006
089172
6815
Herculis, V669
Asymptotic-giant-branch stars